Thierry Bayock (born 27 August 1979) is a Cameroonian footballer. He plays in the right offensive midfield for Banneux in the Belgian Provincial Leagues.

Bayock previously played for Alemannia Aachen, RCS Visé, Oud-Heverlee Leuven, K.V.K. Tienen, Seraing R.U.L., and KFC Dessel Sport.

References

1979 births
Living people
Cameroonian footballers
Alemannia Aachen players
Oud-Heverlee Leuven players
K.V.K. Tienen-Hageland players
K.F.C. Dessel Sport players
C.S. Visé players
R.R.F.C. Montegnée players
Challenger Pro League players
2. Bundesliga players
Expatriate footballers in Belgium
Expatriate footballers in Germany
Cameroonian expatriate footballers
Association football midfielders